Air Leap was the trading name of the Norwegian Virtual airline Air Leap AS and the Swedish airline Air Leap Aviation AB.

History
Air Leap was founded by the same owners as the airline FlyViking. After FlyViking ceased operations in January 2018, the virtual airline Next Move was founded in March 2018 to continue operating the Ørland - Oslo Gardermoen route. Next Move was renamed Air Leap after the company bought parts of the bankrupt Swedish airline Nextjet. The parts of Nextjet became the Swedish Air Leap, but lacked an Air operator's certificate (AOC) to operate the Swedish routes, which is why all flights in the beginning were operated by Denmark's Danish Air Transport (DAT), the Estonian NyxAir and the Dutch AIS Airlines, among others. 

On 11 June 2018 flights were resumed in Sweden. On 19 October 2018, the Swedish Transport Agency awarded Air Leap Air Operator Certificate (AOC) and registered the company as the official operator of three Saab 340Bs. The first flight under new AOC took place on 21 October 2018 from Stockholm-Arlanda to Mariehamn.

On 24 January 2022, the company suspended operations and filed for reorganization, citing financial issues as a result of a lack of government aid from the COVID-19 pandemic.

Destinations

This is a list of destinations operated by Air Leap:

Fleet
As of January 2022, prior to the suspension of all operations, the Air Leap fleet consists of the following aircraft:

References

External links 

Defunct airlines of Norway
Defunct airlines of Sweden
Airlines established in 2018
Airlines disestablished in 2022
Swedish companies established in 2018
2018 establishments in Norway
2022 disestablishments in Sweden
2022 disestablishments in Norway
Companies based in Stockholm